Municipal elections in Haryana for the post of president were held in 2022 for 46 local bodies. The 46 local bodies included 18 municipal councils and 26 municipal committees.

Background

Schedule

Parties and alliances







Others

Election results
The results of the election were counted and declared on  22 June 2022.

Notes

References

Haryana
Local elections in Haryana
H